Chip Van Os (born February 13, 1970) is an American handball player. He competed in the men's tournament at the 1996 Summer Olympics. He later became a managing director at Scotiabank.

References

External links
 

1970 births
Living people
American male handball players
Olympic handball players of the United States
Handball players at the 1996 Summer Olympics
Sportspeople from Houston